The London Midland and Scottish Railway (LMS), Rebuilt Patriot Class was a class of 4-6-0 steam locomotives. They were rebuilt from LMS Patriot Class locomotives (which were the fourth type of LMS 2A boilered 4-6-0 locomotives) over the period 1946–1949. By the end of 1947, the LMS had rebuilt seven engines, these being 5514/21/26/29–31/40. After nationalisation, a further eleven locomotives were rebuilt. Rebuilt locomotives retained their numbers.

Rebuilding 

Between 1946 and 1949 eighteen LMS Patriot Class engines were rebuilt with Stanier 2A boiler, cab and tender, though these were largely paper rebuilds, based on the LMS Rebuilt Royal Scot Class.  Seven (Nos 5514/21/6/9-31/40) had been rebuilt by the start of 1948 when British Railways inherited them.  In March 1948 BR added 40000 to their numbers to number them 45514/21/6/9-31/40. Subsequently, BR rebuilt another 11 of the Patriots, so that the rebuilt engines were (4)5512/14/21–23/25–32/34–36/45.  The two original members of the class, and the first ten of the nominal rebuilds, were not rebuilt due to their non-standard parts.

Details 

Details of the engines as rebuilt are given below. Note that this only shows LMS numbers as carried by rebuilt engines of the LMS.

Withdrawal 

The rebuilt Patriots were withdrawn between 1961 and 1965 in accordance with the BR Modernisation Plan and none were preserved.

Models 

Mainline produced a model.

 

Hornby produced a model.

References

7 Patriot
4-6-0 locomotives
Railway locomotives introduced in 1946
Scrapped locomotives
Rebuilt locomotives 
Passenger locomotives